Myrna Casas (January 2, 1934 – November 9, 2022) was a Puerto Rican experimental playwright, director, actress, and theatre scholar. She was the co-founder and artistic director of the company Producciones Cisne.

Early life
Casas was born in San Juan to Carmen Busó Carrasquillo and Sixto Casas Semidei. She studied Drama at Vassar College, graduating in 1954, and earned a master's degree in acting at Boston University in 1961. She went on to study at New York University where she obtained a doctorate in Theatre education in 1974.

Career
A member of the sixties generation, Casas's work addressed Puerto Rican national identity through both absurdist and realist plays. She also explored the themes of women in patriarchal societies, as in her play Eugenia Victoria Herrera. Her 1988 play The Great Ukrainian Circus (El gran circo Ucraniano) has been performed regularly and examined by scholars.

Casas for many years taught at the University of Puerto Rico in the drama department, which she also directed for several years. She acted in the 1950s and served in the San Juan municipal assembly from 1996 to 2000.

In June 2022, the Columbia University Libraries acquired Casas's papers, including her original annotated manuscripts of all plays written since 1960, as part of its Latino Art and Activism Archives.

Personal life and death
Casas died on a November 9, 2022, at the age of 88.

Works
Casas wrote more than 30 plays, including:
Cristal roto en el tiempo (A Glass Broken in Time) – 1960
Eugenia Victoria Herrera – 1964
Absurdos en soledad – 1964
La trampa (The Trap) – 1974
No todas lo tienen (They Don't All Have It) – 1975
Al garete
Cuarenta años después (Forty Years Later) – 1976
Crónicas de obsesión
Tres noches tropicales (Three Tropical Nights)
Juegos de obsesión
Las reinas del Chantecler
El gran circo Ucraniano (The Great Ukrainian Circus) – 1988 (winner of the National Dramaturgy award of the Circle of Puerto Rican Drama Critics)
Este país no existe (This Country Doesn't Exist) – 1993

Casas also wrote an opera libretto, El mensajero de plata.

Honors
Casas received honors from the Center for Advanced Studies on Puerto Rico and the Caribbean (2013), Ateneo Puertorriqueño (2005), the University of Tennessee (2006), the Puerto Rican Senate (2004), and SOGEM (Sociedad de Escritores de México) (1990).

In 2019 the Universidad del Sagrado Corazón dedicated the celebration of World Theatre Day to Casas.

See also 

List of Puerto Ricans
Dean Zayas - another Puerto Rican playwright

References

1934 births
2022 deaths
Puerto Rican women writers
Puerto Rican dramatists and playwrights
20th-century Puerto Rican actresses
Vassar College alumni
Boston University College of Fine Arts alumni
New York University alumni
University of Puerto Rico faculty
American women academics
People from San Juan, Puerto Rico